Lough Eidin, also known as Drumharlow Lake or Lough Drumharlow, is a lake in Ireland, located west of Carrick-on-Shannon. It is located on the Boyle River just above its junction with the Shannon.,.

Wildlife
Roach, bream, brown trout and rudd are the main fish.

There are extensive callows on the shoreline, which is proposed as a Natural Heritage Area. A flock of Greenland white-fronted geese (Anser albifrons flavirostris) feed there.

Regattas
A regatta was held on this lake in 1895, but the regatta was not repeated because the lake was too small.

See also 
 List of loughs in Ireland

References 

Lakes of County Roscommon